Hollywood on Parade (1932–1934) is a series of short subjects released by Paramount Pictures.

Production background
One short (# B-9) is frequently misidentified as future Stooge Curly Howard's first appearance on film, as cited by historians (he replaces Shemp). This is because it was mistaken for a 1932 short when Criterion Pictures acquired the shorts for television distribution in the early 1950s, and slapped a generic title card on all films in this series with a 1932 copyright notice.

In fact, # B-9 was a 1934 Paramount release, and most likely filmed during a loan-out period for Howard from MGM, around the same time Ted Healy and the Three Stooges costarred in Myrt and Marge (1933) for Universal Studios.

This is one of only two movies to portray a live-action Betty Boop. The other is a Paramount short film Musical Justice (1931), in which Mae Questel portrays Betty Boop.

Cast

Ben Alexander
Gracie Allen
Adrienne Ames
Richard Arlen
Roscoe Ates
Baby Peggy
Max Baer
George Bancroft
Tallulah Bankhead
Richard Barthelmess
Warner Baxter
Rex Bell
Constance Bennett
Joan Bennett
Sally Blane
Joan Blondell
Mary Boland
Bonnie Bonnell
Eddie Borden
El Brendel
George Brent
Clive Brook
Joe E. Brown
Brox Sisters
George Burns
Bruce Cabot
Leo Carrillo
Charlie Chaplin
Ruth Chatterton
Virginia Cherrill
Maurice Chevalier
Lew Cody
Claudette Colbert
William Collier Jr.
Ronald Colman
Russ Columbo
Gary Cooper
Jackie Cooper
Buster Crabbe
Richard Cromwell
Bing Crosby
Constance Cummings
Viola Dana
Bebe Daniels
Mickey Daniels
Frankie Darro
Frances Dee
Claudia Dell
Cecil B. DeMille
Jack Dempsey
Florence Desmond
Marlene Dietrich
Richard Dix
Fifi D'Orsay
Billie Dove
Louise Dresser
Jimmy Durante
Cliff Edwards
Stuart Erwin
Ruth Etting
Douglas Fairbanks Jr.
Larry Fine
Norman Foster
Clark Gable
Richard Gallagher
Paulette Goddard
Mack Gordon
Jetta Goudal
Cary Grant
Sid Grauman
Mitzi Green
Lloyd Hamilton
Jean Harlow
Raymond Hatton
Ted Healy
Jack Holt
Miriam Hopkins
Edward Everett Horton
Moe Howard
Curly Howard
Walter Huston
Chic Johnson
Arline Judge
Eddie Kane
Helen Kane
Buster Keaton
Alvin "Shipwreck" Kelly
Harry Langdon
Charles Laughton
Harold Lloyd
Carole Lombard
Bessie Love
Edmund Lowe
Béla Lugosi
Ben Lyon
Jeanette MacDonald
Fredric March
The Marx Brothers
Tim McCoy
Adolphe Menjou
Tom Mix
Robert Montgomery
Polly Moran
Clarence Muse
Jack Oakie
Ole Olsen
Eddie Peabody
Mary Pickford
Bonnie Poe
William Powell
Marie Prevost
George Raft
Gene Raymond
Harry Revel
Ginger Rogers
Benny Rubin
Chic Sale
Ann Sheridan
Alison Skipworth
Anita Stewart
Gloria Swanson
Lilyan Tashman
Estelle Taylor
Jimmy Thomson
Thelma Todd
Raquel Torres
Ben Turpin
Rudy Vallée
Lupe Velez
Johnny Weissmuller
Mae West
Bert Wheeler
Alice White
Warren William
Lois Wilson
Anna May Wong
Robert Woolsey
Fay Wray
Ed Wynn
Roland Young

List of shorts
NOTE: This list is probably incomplete.

Hollywood on Parade # A-1 (released August 26, 1932)
Hollywood on Parade # A-2 (released September 23, 1932)
Hollywood on Parade # A-3 (released October 21, 1932)
Hollywood on Parade # A-4 (released November 18, 1932)
Hollywood on Parade # A-5 (released December 16, 1932)
Hollywood on Parade # A-6 (released January 13, 1933)
Hollywood on Parade # A-7 (released 1933)
Hollywood on Parade No. A-8 (released March 10, 1933)
Hollywood on Parade # A-9 (released April 7, 1933)
Hollywood on Parade # A-10 (released 1933)
Hollywood on Parade # A-11 (released 1933)
Hollywood on Parade # A-12 (released June 30, 1933)
Hollywood on Parade # B-1 (released August 18, 1933)
Hollywood on Parade # B-2 (released 1933)
Hollywood on Parade # B-3 (released 1933)
Hollywood on Parade # B-4 (released 1933)
Hollywood on Parade # B-5 (released December 1933)
Hollywood on Parade # B-6 (released January 5, 1934)
Hollywood on Parade # B-7 (released February 2, 1934)
Hollywood on Parade # B-8 (released March 30, 1934)
Hollywood on Parade # B-9 (released 1934)
Hollywood on Parade # B-10 (released 1934)
Hollywood on Parade # B-11 (released 1934)
Hollywood on Parade # B-12 (released 1934)
Hollywood on Parade # B-13 (released July 20, 1934)

External links 
 
 

American black-and-white films
The Three Stooges films
1932 comedy films
1932 films
Paramount Pictures short films
American comedy short films
1930s English-language films
1930s American films